Toby Emmerich (born February 8, 1963), is an American producer, film executive, and screenwriter. He has been with Warner Bros. for much of his career, and formerly served as the chairman of the Warner Bros. Pictures Group.

Biography
Emmerich was born to Constance (née Marantz) and André Emmerich (1924–2007), a Frankfurt-born gallery owner and art dealer. His parents lived in New York City at the time of his birth. He is Jewish. He is the brother of Noah Emmerich, an actor, and Adam Emmerich, a mergers and acquisitions lawyer at the firm of Wachtell, Lipton, Rosen & Katz in New York. He attended The Calhoun School in New York City and then graduated from Wesleyan University.

He has been producer or executive producer of over 50 films. He also wrote the screenplays to the films Frequency and The Last Mimzy, among other screenplays. He was also the executive music producer of the films Menace II Society and Above The Rim and is given thanks in the credits of Wayne Kramer's 2006 thriller film Running Scared.

After serving as president of production at New Line Cinema, Emmerich became president and chief operating officer of New Line on March 18, 2008. In 2017, he became President and Chief Content Officer of the Warner Bros. Pictures Group, and later in 2018 its chairman. As chairman, he "has oversight of the Studio’s global theatrical production, marketing and distribution operations and also oversees the marketing and distribution activities of Warner Bros. Home Entertainment". In October 2019, he extended his contract as chairman of Warner Bros. Pictures Group and elevated top lieutenant Carolyn Blackwood to the newly created position of chief operating officer.

On June 1, 2022, Emmerich announced his resignation from his position with Warner Bros, with Michael De Luca and Pamela Abdy set to replace him after their contracts with Amazon-owned Metro-Goldwyn-Mayer expire. Emmerich remained at his post for a "transitional period" before starting his own production company, signing a five-year funding and distribution deal with Warner Bros. De Luca and Abdy took over in July 2022.

Filmography

References

External links
 

1963 births
Living people
Wesleyan University alumni
American people of French-Jewish descent
American people of German-Jewish descent
American people of Hungarian-Jewish descent
American people of Romanian-Jewish descent
Businesspeople from New York City
American chief operating officers
Warner Bros. Discovery people
Warner Bros. people